6 Teens  is a 2001 Indian Telugu-language teen film directed by G.Nageswara Reddy making his directorial debut and produced by J.Srinivasa Reddy. The film was remade in Kannada as Friends (2002).

Plot
6 Teens is story about a group of five sex obsessed teenage boys who, after humiliating themselves at college, pursue a new girl neighbour from the U.S.

Cast
Rohit
Ruthika
Santosh
 Pavan
 Abhijit
Amit
 Vijaya Bhaskar
Rakhi Sawant
M. S. Narayana
L. B. Sriram
Mallikarjuna Rao
Rajitha
Ironleg Sastri

Production 
Rohit, who worked as an assistant director for Tammareddy Bharadwaja's Swarnakka (1998) in which he also made a cameo appearance, made his lead acting debut with this film after being called in for a screen test.

Music
The music was composed by Ghantadi Krishna. The song "Devudu Varamandisthe" became popular.

Future
A Tamil version of the film, headlined by actor Jai, was shot and complete in 2003. However, the film did not have a theatrical release.

A sequel to this film titled 9 Teens was planned but later dropped.

References

External links
 

2001 films
2000s Telugu-language films
Indian sex comedy films
Indian coming-of-age comedy films
Telugu films remade in other languages
2001 directorial debut films
Films directed by G. Nageswara Reddy
2000s coming-of-age comedy films
2000s sex comedy films